Suspense is an American television anthology series that ran on CBS Television from 1949 to 1954. It was adapted from the radio program of the same name which ran from 1942 to 1962.

Series overview
The show was broadcast live from New York City to stations on CBS's eastern and midwestern networks. Kinescope recordings were made for transmission via KTTV in Hollywood. It was sponsored by the Auto-Lite corporation, and each episode was introduced by host Rex Marshall, who promoted Auto-Lite spark plugs, car batteries, headlights, and other car parts.

Some of the early scripts were adapted from Suspense radio scripts, while others were original for television. Like the radio program, many scripts were adaptations of literary classics by well-known authors. Classic authors such as Edgar Allan Poe, Agatha Christie, and Charles Dickens all had stories adapted for the series, while contemporary authors such as Roald Dahl and Gore Vidal also contributed. Many notable actors appeared on the program, including Bela Lugosi, Boris Karloff, Cloris Leachman, Brian Keith, Franchot Tone, Robert Emhardt, Leslie Nielsen, and Lloyd Bridges.

The ninety existing episodes are available today on three DVD box sets. TubiTV.com also is streaming episodes of the show.

Critical response
A review in The New York Times of the program's premiere episode, "Revnge", commended the "great technical skill" of mixing filmed segments with live studio shots, a technique that the review labeled a "novel aspect". Beyond that, however, reviewer Jay Gould found little to like about the episode, which he wrote was "a badly contrived piece of trivia", described elsewhere in the review as having "a drab story and an inexcusably poor supporting cast". Even so, he wrote that with improvements "the mystery show should be a serviceable staple on video."

The trade publication Variety commented in a review of the same episode that "Suspense made an inauspicious debut" on television, comparing the episode to a B film. The reviewer blamed a "weakly motivated" adaptation for causing the direction and acting to suffer. Robert Stevens, who produced and directed, was cited for failing to add excitement to an already weak script.

Episodes

Season 1 (1948-1949)

Season 2 (1949-1950)
Oct. 11, 1949 - "The Cask of Amontillado" - starring Bela Lugosi
May 30, 1950 - "Listen, Listen" - Mildred Natwick
June 6, 1950 - "Black Bronze" - Franchot Tone
June 27, 1050 - "Wisteria Cottage" - Conrad Janis, Marjorie Gateson
October 10, 1950 - "Criminal's Mark" - Catherine McLeod
October 17, 1950 - "The Man Who Would Be King" - Francis L. Sullivan
November 14, 1950 - "The Brush Off" - Leslie Nielsen, Mary Sinclair
November 21, 1950 - "Justice Has Been Done" - Francis Sullivan

Season 3 (1950-1951)

Season 4 (1951-1952)
April 17, 1951 - "The Juice Man" - Cloris Leachman, Robert Webber, Robert Emhardt

Season 5 (1952-1953)
October 7, 1952 - "The Man in the Mirror" - Gerald O'Loughlin, Constance Ford, Sally Gracie, Larry Gates, Cliff Hall, Archie Smith, Arthur Marlowe
October 14, 1952 - "The Blue Panther" -Phyllis Brooks, Michael Strong, Erik Rhodes, Gene Anton Jr., Bruce Gordon, Michael Garrett, Tom Avera, Gina Petrushka
October 21, 1952 - "The Man Who Had 7 Hours" - Robert Sterling, Gaby Rodgers, Walter Kohler, Ludie Claire, Susan Caubet, Marcel Hillaire, MacLean Savage
October 28, 1952 - "All Hallow's Eve" - Franchot Tone, Francis Compton, Romney Brent, Patricia Byrd, Penny Hays, Douglas Jay, Bobby Catanio
November 11, 1952 - "Moving Target" - Jamie Smith, Irja Jensen, Joseph Anthony, Wolfe Barzell, Rudy Bond, Kalle Ruusumen, Jan DeRuth, Nina Hansen
January 13, 1953 - "Mr. Matches" - Warren Stevens, Henry Jones, Eleanor Wilson
August 8, 1953 - "Nightmare At Ground Zero" by Rod Serling - O.Z. Whitehead, Louise Larabee, Pat Hingle

References

External links

Suspense TV: An Introduction to the Show
Suspense episode "Woman in Love" (August 26, 1952) at Internet Archive
Suspense at CVTA with episode list

CBS original programming
1949 American television series debuts
1954 American television series endings
1940s American anthology television series
1950s American anthology television series
Black-and-white American television shows
Thriller television series
Television series based on radio series
Television shows filmed in New York City